= Pate D'oie Forest Reserve =

The Patte d'Oie Forest Reserve is in the Republic of the Congo. It was established on 13 August 1938. This site is 240.00ha.

This mixed forest, encompassing blocks of natural mesophile forest and plantations, lies in the heart of the Congolese capital, covering a still appreciable area of 125 ha (as against 214 ha when it was created in 1938).
